Shurestan-e Olya (also Romanized as Shūrestān-e ‘Olyā; also known as Shūrestān, Shūrestān Bālā, Shūrestān-e Bālā, Shūristān Bālā) is a village in Salehabad Rural District, Salehabad County, Razavi Khorasan Province, Iran. At the 2006 census, its population was 927, in 206 families.

References 

Populated places in Torbat-e Jam County